Dukhovshchina is a town and the administrative center of Dukhovshchinsky District in Smolensk Oblast, Russia, located on the Vostitsa River  northeast of Smolensk, the administrative center of the oblast. Population:

Climate
Dukhovshchina has a warm-summer humid continental climate (Dfb in the Köppen climate classification).

<div style="width:70%;">

History
Dukhovshchina developed on the spot of the Dukhov Monastery, established at some point in the 15th century. It was granted town status in 1777. It was captured by Napoleon's Grande Armée during the 1812 Battle of Smolensk and was occupied during World War II by the Wehrmacht from July 15, 1941 to September 19, 1943.

According to the 1939 census, 102 Jews were living in Dukhovshchina. The Jews were forced to work after the German invasion. The Jews were gathered in a ghetto, which was liquidated in the summer of 1942. During this time, 300 Jews perished in mass executions perpetrated by an Einsatzgruppen.

Administrative and municipal status
Within the framework of administrative divisions, Dukhovshchina serves as the administrative center of Dukhovshchinsky District. As an administrative division, it is, together with one rural locality (the settlement of Lnozavod), incorporated within Dukhovshchinsky District as Dukhovshchinskoye Urban Settlement. As a municipal division, this administrative unit also has urban settlement status and is a part of Dukhovshchinsky Municipal District.

References

Notes

Sources

External links

Official website of Dukhovshchina 
Dukhovshchina Business Directory 
 Mojgorod.ru. Entry on Dukhovshchina  

Cities and towns in Smolensk Oblast
Dukhovshchinsky Uyezd
Holocaust locations in Russia